Lapa is a train station on CPTM Line 7-Ruby, in the district of Lapa in São Paulo.

History

Lapa station was opened by São Paulo Railway on 20 February 1899. In 1947, SPR lines were transferred to the federal government, which created Santos-Jundiaí Railway (EFSJ). Later, EFSJ started the line electrification and rebuilt many stations, among them Lapa station, in the 1950s.

After the decay of commuter trains, in the 1970s and 1980s, the station was transferred in 1994 to CPTM, which started a small reform in it years later.

Projects
Besides the unification, the station should receive one more train line, 8-Diamond, and two Metro lines, 20-Pink (Lapa-Prefeito Saladino) and 23-Magenta (Lapa-Dutra).

References

Companhia Paulista de Trens Metropolitanos stations
Railway stations opened in 1899